Twenty Dollars a Week is a 1924 American silent comedy drama film directed by F. Harmon Weight and starring George Arliss, Taylor Holmes, and Edith Roberts. Ronald Colman, then a rising star, had a supporting role as Arliss's character's son. The film was long thought lost before a print was rediscovered in the Library of Congress collection.

Plot
As described in a film magazine review, John Reeves, steel magnate, wagers with his son Chester that he can earn twenty dollars a week and live on it. He procures work in the office of William Hart's steel plant. Against her brother's wish, Hart's sister Muriel adopts a little boy. Hart evens up by adopting John Reeves as his father. Reeves foils James Pettison's plot to ruin Hart. Chester also makes good as a workman and wins the affection of Hart's sister. The father reveals his identity and takes Hart as a partner.

Cast

Preservation
Prints of Twenty Dollars a Week are located in the Library of Congress and Ngā Taonga Sound & Vision (New Zealand Film Archive).

References

Bibliography
 Goble, Alan. The Complete Index to Literary Sources in Film. Walter de Gruyter, 1999.

External links

1924 films
1924 comedy films
American black-and-white films
American silent feature films
1920s rediscovered films
Selznick Pictures films
Rediscovered American films
1920s English-language films
1920s American films
Silent American comedy films